Reason to Smile is the debut studio album by British rapper Kojey Radical, released 4 March 2022 by Asylum Records and Atlantic Records. It was shortlisted for the 2022 Mercury Prize and nominated for Album of the Year at the 2022 MOBO Awards.

Background 
The album was preceded by four singles: "War Outside" released 23 September 2021; "Gangsta" released 15 November; "Payback" released 15 January 2022; and "Silk" released 18 February. The first three came along with music videos while "Silk" received an official visualiser. Another video for "Talkin" released 9 March, featuring animated versions of Radical and the song's guests Tiana Major9 and Kelis.

Reception 

 "Payback" was included at number 9 on BBC Musics list of the best songs of the year.

Accolades

Track listing

Personnel

Musicians 

 Kojey Radical – vocals
 Cameron Palmer – synth bass (2, 5, 10), piano (5, 8), keyboards (10, 13), organ (8), synthesizer (8), Rhodes solo (8), guitar (10), Wurlitzer (11)
 Kwame "KZ" Kwei-Armah Jr. – additional vocals (1, 3, 6, 10), synthesizer (2, 13), piano (1), Rhodes solo (2), piano (7), bass (8), guitar (8), synth bass (9), whistling (9)
 Tiana Major9 – vocals (1, 8)
 Masego – vocals (4)
 Shaé Universe – vocals (5)
 Cashh – vocals (6)
 Kelis – vocals (8)
 Lex Amor – vocals (9)
 Knucks – vocals (10)
 Shakka – vocals (12)
 Wretch 32 – vocals (12), additional vocals (8)
 Ego Ella May – vocals (13), additional vocals (9)
 Rexx Life Raj – vocals (14)
 Ayanna Christie Brown – additional vocals (2, 10)
 Emmavie – additional vocals (2, 10)
 Michael Stafford – additional vocals (2, 10)

 Christina Matovu – additional vocals (4, 7, 12, 15)
 Mundu – additional vocals (4, 14)
 Bobii Lewis – additional vocals (6)
 Benjamin Totten – guitar (1, 11)
 David Mrakpor – guitar, keyboards, synth bass (4)
 Rashaan Brown – guitar (6)
 Greg Mathews – guitar (8)
 Femi Koleoso – drums (1, 5)
 Namali Kwaten – drums, percussion (4)
 Dayna Fisher – bass guitar (6, 7, 11, 15), trombone (1)
 Neil Waters – trumpet (1–4, 10, 15), flugelhorn (4, 5, 11)
 Trevor Mires – trombone (2–4, 6–8, 10, 13, 15), sousaphone (7, 10), bass trombone (13)
 Charlie Stock and Stella Page – viola (1, 2, 4, 6–8, 12, 13, 15)
 Ezme Gaze and Wayne Urquhart – cello (1, 2, 4, 6–8, 12, 13, 15)
 Antonia Pagulatos, Emma Blanco, Marsha Skins, and Sam Kennedy – violin (1, 2, 4, 6–8, 12, 13, 15)
 Nathan "Flutebox" Lee – flute (2)
 Mike Keys – keyboards (9), piano, synth bass (13)
 Ed Thomas – piano (15)

Technical 
 Cameron Palmer – engineering (1, 2, 5, 7–10, 13, 15), drum programming (2, 5, 9, 10, 13)
 Kwame "KZ" Kwei-Armah Jr. – executive producer, engineering (1, 2, 6–9, 11–15), drum programming (6, 8, 9), vocal arrangements (13)
 Swindle – executive producer
 Stuart Hawkes – mastering engineer (1–9, 11–14)
 Joker – mixing engineer (1–8, 10–14)
 Neil Waters – string arrangements (1, 2, 4, 6–8, 12, 13, 15)
 Namali Kwaten – drum programming (4), sound design (4)
 Blue Lab Beats – engineering (4)
 Jay Weathers – drum programming (15)

Charts

References 

2022 debut albums
Kojey Radical albums
Asylum Records albums
Atlantic Records albums